Nikan Wailan (? - 1587) was a Jurchen leader affiliated with the Ming dynasty and a rival of Nurhaci.

Name
In the Jurchen language, Nikan Wailan means "secretary of Han Chinese", thus his existence is suspected by some historians.

Life
In 1582, Nurhaci's father Taksi and grandfather Giocangga were killed in an attack on Gure (in present-day Xinbin Manchu Autonomous County) by Nikan, while being led by Li Chengliang. The following year, Nurhaci began to unify the Jurchen bands around his area.

In 1584, when Nurhaci was 25, he attacked Nikan Wailan at Turun (also in Xinbin) to avenge the deaths of his father and grandfather, who are said to have left him nothing but thirteen suits of armour. Nikan Wailan fled away to Erhun, which Nurhaci attacked again in 1587. Nikan Wailan this time fled to Li Chengliang's territory. Later, as a way to build relationship, Li gave Nikan Wailan to Nurhaci, who beheaded Nikan Wailan immediately. With Li's support, Nurhaci gradually grew his strength in the following years.

References

1587 deaths
Date of birth unknown
Jurchens in Ming dynasty
Executed Ming dynasty people